North Ayrshire Wild  is a Scottish ice hockey team that play in the Scottish National League. They play their games at  Auchenharvie Ice Rink in Stevenston, North Ayrshire.

Club roster 2020–21

2020/21 Outgoing

External links
 North Ayrshire Ice Hockey Club

Ice hockey teams in Scotland
Sport in North Ayrshire
Ice hockey clubs established in 2002
2002 establishments in Scotland
Ardrossan−Saltcoats−Stevenston